You Stupid Man is a 2002 romantic comedy film written and directed by Brian Burns and starring Milla Jovovich, David Krumholtz, William Baldwin, Denise Richards, Dan Montgomery Jr., and Jessica Cauffiel.

Storyline
Owen is beginning to get over his former girlfriend, Chloe, who has recently moved to Los Angeles to become an actress. Owen finds love with another woman, Nadine, shortly before his former girlfriend's television show is canceled, and Chloe declares that she wants him back.

Cast 
 Milla Jovovich as Nadine
 David Krumholtz as Owen
 Denise Richards as Chloe
 Dan Montgomery Jr. as Jack
 Jessica Cauffiel as Diane
 William Baldwin as  Brady
 Landy Cannon as Rodger

Production
You Stupid Man was filmed in New York City and Toronto in December 2000 to January 2001. The shots of the World Trade Center remained in the film after September 11th attacks in 2001 as a tribute.

Release
You Stupid Man made its premiere at The Hamptons International Film Festival on October 18, 2002.

Reception
Reviewer Michael Rankins noted the plot was "while not stupid, the movie does manage to be agonizingly predictable" and had many similarities to When Harry Met Sally..., as one reviewer explained, the two characters "decided to follow [the When Harry Met Sally] story line instead of coming up with their own". Charles Tatum of eFilmCritic.com gave it 2 out of 5, a was critical of the screenplay but praised Jovovich for her performance and her "are you fucking kidding me?" look in response to Krumholtz.

References

External links 
 
 

2002 romantic comedy films
2002 films
2000s English-language films
American romantic comedy films
Impact of the September 11 attacks on cinema
2000s American films